Aerial silks (also known as aerial contortion, aerial ribbons,  aerial tissues, fabric, ribbon, or tissu) is a type of performance in which one or more artists perform aerial acrobatics while hanging from a specialist fabric. The fabric may be hung as two pieces, or a single piece, folded to make a loop, classified as hammock silks. Performers climb the suspended fabric without the use of safety lines and rely only on their training and skill to ensure safety. They use the fabric to wrap, suspend, drop, swing, and spiral their bodies into and out of various positions. The fabric may also be used to fly through the air, striking poses and figures. Some performers use rosin (dried or mixed with rubbing alcohol) on their hands and feet to increase the friction and grip on the fabric. Aerial silks is a demanding art and requires a high degree of strength, power, flexibility, courage, stamina, and grace to practice.

Tricks 

The three main categories of tricks are climbs, wraps, and drops. Climbs employed by aerialists range from purely practical and efficient, such as the Russian climb, to athletic and elegant, such as the straddle climb. Wraps are static poses where aerialists wrap the silks around one or more parts of their body. In general, the more complicated the wrap, the stronger the force of friction and the less effort required to hold oneself up. Some wraps, such as the straddle-back-balance, actually allow performers to completely release their hands. Foot locks are a sub-category of wraps where the silks are wrapped around one or both feet; for instance, an ankle hang. In a drop, performers wrap themselves high up on the silks before falling to a lower position. Drops can combine aspects of free fall, rolling or otherwise rotating oneself before landing in a new pose. Preparation for a drop can make for a pretty wrap, but the ultimate goal is the fall rather than the pose. Of the three trick types, drops require the most strength and are also the most potentially dangerous.

Fabrics
The fabrics used as silks are very strong with some give and flexibility. They are either two-way stretch spandex or nylon. The width varies depending on the routine and the acrobat. The fabric is doubled, giving the artist two strips to work with as they perform.

 Stretch
 Low-stretch fabrics: Low-stretch fabrics are primarily used by beginners who have not yet developed proper climbing technique.
 Medium-stretch fabrics: Medium-stretch fabrics are the principal choice of professional aerialists and graduates of professional training programs.
 Width:  Fabric width is mostly a personal choice. The thickness of the fabric when gathered is also influenced by the "denier", or technical thickness of the fabric's weave. 40 denier is a common choice. The following applies to 40 denier nylon fabric:
 60" - Narrow when open, thin when gathered. Fairly common simply because the fabric is widely available.
 72-84" - Average for adult performers
 96" - Wide when open, thick when gathered. Best for adults with large hands.
 108" - Very wide and thick. For adults with very large hands, or specialty acts.
 Length: Fabric length is a function of the height of the space available.
 For beginners, it is beneficial if the fabric comes down past the ground, allowing them to practice wraps at a lower level where they can be spotted.
 For intermediate users and above, it is sufficient if the fabrics come down to the ground.
There are a great many tricks that can be done on a  aerial fabric and a few drops require more than 30 feet, but for the most part  is best.

History

It is not known for certain who invented the art form of performing aerial dance on fabrics. Fred Deb of Drapés Aériens is widely known to be one of the founders around 1992. André Simard was hired by Cirque du Soleil to develop and research acrobatics in 1987; his job was to discover original and imaginative ways to attract audiences, and is also regarded as one of the founders around 1995. Now silks have been incorporated into the circus arts and are practiced as a form of aerial fitness.

Rigging
Aerial rigging applies to the hanging of aerial silks. Aerial silk rigging equipment commonly includes:

 a figure-eight descender, rescue eight, ring, or another piece of hardware for attaching the silk;
 a ball-bearing swivel to keep the silk from twisting and to allow for spinning;
 carabiners for connecting the silk hardware to the swivel, and for connecting the swivel to a mounting point. Depending on the setup, there can be multiple carabiners in use at one time.

Carabiners are the most used rigging piece for all aerial arts, but only two or three styles are safe for aerial use; these are the auto lock gate and screw gate carabiner.  rated two different ways, one for the spine and one for the gate. Distributing weight on the gate is not recommended, for it is about 1/3 of the spine kN rating. For aerial silk as for other aerial arts, a screw gate carabiner is used rotated to screw down to decrease the risk that the carabiner will accidentally open or that the screw gate will become unscrewed.

 A span set or daisy chain are often used to add length to the silks if needed; they are also used to wrap around a beam.
 A span set is a polyester loop that can hold up to 44kN (10,000 lbs), depending on the quality. 
 A daisy chain is made of nylon webbing with loops sewn on, to offer more length variation, but it is less strong then a span set and may not be able to withstand the downward force of drops and other aerial tricks. A basic daisy chain tops out at around 4kN (1,000 lbs) on each loop, and end to end is around 22kN (5,000 lbs).

See also
Rope climbing
Aerial hoop
Aerial dance
Aerial straps

References 

 Basic Circus Arts Instruction Manual: Chapter 2 - "Static Trapeze, Rope and Silks." [PDF, 6.2 MB] and Chapter 8 - "Manual for Safety and Rigging." [PDF, 3.3 MB] European Federation of Professional Circus Schools (FEDEC), 2008.
 FM 5-125: Rigging Techniques, Procedures, and Applications. [PDF, 3.6 MB] US Army, 1995.
 Sharon McCutcheon, Geoff Perrem.  Circus in Schools Handbook. Tarook Publishing, 2004.
 Hovey Burgess, Judy Finelli. Circus Techniques.  Brian Dube, 1989.
 Carrie Heller.  Aerial Circus Training and Safety Manual. National Writers Press, 2004. 
 Jayne C. Bernasconi and Nancy E. Smith. Aerial Dance. United States: Human Kinetics, 2008.  View at Google Books
 Elena Zanzu, M.A. Il Trapezio Oscillante: Storie di Circo nell'Aria. (The Swinging Trapeze: Histories of the Circus in the Air.) Bologna University, Italy, 2004-2005. Language: Italian.

Performing arts
Circus skills